Justice Erwin may refer to:

Robert Erwin (1934–2020), justice of the Supreme Court of Alaska
Richard K. Erwin (1860-1917), justice of the Indiana Supreme Court

See also
Justice Ervin (disambiguation)